George Atkinson (June 2, 1935 – March 3, 2005), was an American businessman, credited as the father of the storefront video rental store in the U.S. When the first videocassettes became available for the public, he was already in the movie business. Customers in the form of hotels and pizza parlors would rent movie projectors and public domain 8mm movies, and later U-Matic videotape. When VCR's first went on sale in 1975, studios thought they would be a luxury item and that customers would want to buy films to own. Atkinson, however, was the first to see the possibility of a video rental market. (Daily News, December 13, 2002)

In December 1977, George Atkinson spent approximately $3000 to buy one Betamax and one VHS copy of each of the 50 available movie titles from Magnetic Video, which were then being sold to the public by direct mail. He announced the availability of the videos for rent in the sports section of a local newspaper, after already advertising "Video for Rent" at an earlier date before he had any videos, along with a coupon for readers to fill out and mail in. Atkinson turned his shop into the first professionally managed video rental store and renamed it Video Station, a 600 square foot (56 m²) storefront on Wilshire Boulevard in Los Angeles. In order to raise capital, Atkinson charged $50 for an "annual membership" and $100 for a "lifetime membership," which provided the opportunity to rent the videos for $10 a day.

Atkinson was soon threatened with a lawsuit for renting the videos, but discovered that U.S. copyright law gave him the right to rent and re-sell videos he owned. The battle to protect the public's right to rent videos was a major catalyst for the establishment of the Video Software Dealers Association in 1981.

Atkinson established the first major chain of video specialty retailers -- "The Video Station." At its peak, the chain had over 600 affiliates throughout the U.S. and Canada. He called these independently operated stores "affiliates" rather than franchises, not only in order to get around California's franchise tax but also because he didn't believe in "putting his hand in someone else's cash register." The company went public in 1983 but Atkinson resigned and sold his stake a few years later.(Daily News, December 13, 2002)

He was the first "Video Man of the Year" (1981), named "Video Retailer of the Year" in 1982 and inducted into the Video Hall of Fame in 1991.

References

External links

1935 births
2005 deaths
American entertainment industry businesspeople
Businesspeople from California
Respiratory disease deaths in California
Deaths from emphysema
People from Northridge, Los Angeles
Video rental services
20th-century American businesspeople